In mathematical analysis and metric geometry, Laakso spaces are a class of metric spaces which are fractal, in the sense that they have non-integer Hausdorff dimension, but that admit a notion of differential calculus.  They are constructed as quotient spaces of  where K is a Cantor set.

Background 

Cheeger defined a notion of differentiability for real-valued functions on metric measure spaces which are doubling and satisfy a Poincaré inequality, generalizing the usual notion on Euclidean space and Riemannian manifolds.  Spaces that satisfy these conditions include Carnot groups and other sub-Riemannian manifolds, but not classic fractals such as the Koch snowflake or the Sierpiński gasket.  The question therefore arose whether spaces of fractional Hausdorff dimension can satisfy a Poincaré inequality.  Bourdon and Pajot were the first to construct such spaces.  Tomi J. Laakso gave a different construction which gave spaces with Hausdorff dimension any real number greater than 1.  These examples are now known as Laakso spaces.

Construction 

We describe a space  with Hausdorff dimension .  (For integer dimensions, Euclidean spaces satisfy the desired condition, and for any Hausdorff dimension in the interval , where S is an integer, we can take the space .)  Let  be such that

Then define K to be the Cantor set obtained by cutting out the middle  portion of an interval and iterating that construction.  In other words, K can be defined as the subset of  containing 0 and 1 and satisfying

To save on notation, we now assume that , so that K is the usual middle thirds Cantor set. The general construction is similar but more complicated. Recall that the middle thirds Cantor set consists of all points in  whose ternary expansion consists of only 0's and 2's. For example,

Now let  be a fraction in lowest terms.  For every string a of 0's and 2's of length , and for every point , we identify  with the point .

We give the resulting quotient space the quotient metric:

In the general case, the numbers b (called wormhole levels) and their orders k are defined in a more complicated way so as to obtain a space with the right Hausdorff dimension, but the basic idea is the same.

Properties
  is a doubling space and satisfies a -Poincaré inequality.
  does not have a bilipschitz embedding into any Euclidean space.

References

Metric spaces
Metric geometry